Samuel Friedman may refer to:

Samuel J. Friedman Theatre
Samuel H. Friedman, American journalist and labor union activist

See also
Samuel Freedman (disambiguation)
Samuel Freeman (disambiguation)